Trinitaria may refer to:

La Trinitaria, Chiapas, a town and one of the 119 municipalities of Chiapas, Mexico
La Trinitaria (Dominican Republic), a revolutionary group which fought for independence of the Dominican Republic
Trinitario, a Hispanic-American gang
The Spanish word for the Trinity, a central concept in Christian theology

See also
Trinity (disambiguation)